Manimajra Fort, is a fort situated in Mani Majra, Chandigarh (city of Indian Union).
 It is over 360 years old and has become more popular with the shooting of the Oscar-winning movie Zero Dark Thirty.

History
As per Mahan Kosh, popularly known as Encyclopaedia of Sikhism, Mani Majra was a town of (then) Ambala district of Punjab Province, which was conquered in 1821 by a local zamindar Ghareeb Dass along with 84 other villages and turned into the capital of his newly created State. The State was last ruled by  Bhagwan Singh of the clan of Ghareeb Dass. As Bhagwan Singh was childless, the Government took control of the property of this fort.

Ownership
Presently the property is owned by Meharwal Khewaji Trust along with other related properties. The ownership of this property is under controversy and the case is under trail in the court.

Present condition
The present condition of the fort is not good and it is deteriorating day by day. The premises is being used as a playground or for parking vehicles by people living in the adjoining area. The walls are decaying and weed growth is visible on the walls (see pics in Gallery).

Gallery

References

Monuments and memorials in Punjab, India
Buildings and structures in Chandigarh
Forts in Punjab, India
Tourist attractions in Chandigarh
History of Chandigarh